Institutions of learning named after Thomas Aquinas include the following: